Faiz Ahmad (2 May 1928 – 20 February 2012) was a Bangladeshi journalist, poet, politician and cultural activist. He received Bangla Academy Literary Award in 1976 for his contributions in juvenile literature and Ekushey Padak in Journalism category in 1991.

Early life
Ahmad was born on 2 May 1928 at Bikrampur in Dhaka District during the time of British Raj to Golam Mustafa Chowdhury and Arjudaya Banu.

Awards 
 Bangla Academy Literary Award (1976)
 Ekushey Padak (1991)
 Shishu Academy Literature Award
 Nurul Qader Shishu Literature Award

References

1928 births
2012 deaths
Bangladeshi male writers
Recipients of Bangla Academy Award
Recipients of the Ekushey Padak